Hailuoto Airfield ( or ) is an airfield in Pöllä, Hailuoto, Finland, about  south of Hailuoto village.

See also
List of airports in Finland
List of shortest runways

References

External links
 VFR Suomi/Finland – Hailuoto Airfield
 Lentopaikat.net – Hailuoto Airfield 

Airports in Finland
Airfield
Buildings and structures in North Ostrobothnia